Jessie Strahorn Aspinall (10 December 1880 – 25 August 1953) was the first female junior medical resident at the Royal Prince Alfred Hospital, Camperdown, Sydney. Her four brothers were also medical doctors.

Professional career
In 1906 Aspinall applied for residency at the Royal Prince Alfred Hospital (RPA), but her application was initially rejected by the board. Her father took up her cause and had a long letter published in the Sydney Morning Herald early in February. This drew the attention of the public and of many different groups to the rejection of Jessie's application by the hospital, with one commentator concluding that:  Amid protests from Women's Rights Groups and intense media scrutiny, the board reversed its decision on 2 May. She practiced at RPA until June 1907, when she was appointed the junior house surgeon at the General Hospital, Hobart. In 1908 Jessie was appointed Resident Medical Officer of the Crown Street Women's Hospital, Sydney, and would progress to become Medical Superintendent of the institution. Eventually Jessie moved into private practice, and had consulting rooms at Lyon's Terrace and Macquarie Street, both in central Sydney. Aspinall also served as the school doctor for The Scots College.

Family background and education

Jessie Aspinall was born in Forbes, New South Wales, the third daughter of the Rev. Arthur Aspinall and his wife Helen, the only one to survive to adulthood. Upon moving to Sydney she studied at the Presbyterian Ladies' College, Sydney, Riviere College and Kambala before earning her Bachelor of Medicine from the University of Sydney.

On 22 June 1915, Aspinall married mining engineer Ambrose William Freeman, to whom she bore 4 children: two sons and two daughters, one of whom married the Australian artist, Peter Michael Blayney; thus making Jessie Aspinall/Freeman the mother-in-law of the artist. The family spent two periods living in Malaya. Jessie died of arteriosclerosis. Her ashes were interred in the family grave at the South Head Cemetery.

Cultural activities
Aspinall was actively involved with the Sydney executive of the Victoria League, the National Council of Women and the appeals committee of the Young Women's Christian Association.

Jessie Aspinall will be remembered for being one of the first female doctors in general hospitals in Australia, and whose achievements challenged ingrain cultural beliefs about the position of women within society.

Obituaries
Obituaries to Jessie appeared in the Sydney Morning Herald and in The Medical Journal of Australia.

See also
List of Australian Presbyterians
List of Old Girls of PLC Sydney

References

Andrew, Phillipa A (1997) Built To Last: the stories of John and Thomas Aspinall and their descendants. Privately Published.
: available in the library of The Society of Australian Genealogists, Sydney and the State Library of NSW.
Commonwealth Electoral Rolls (CER)
Historical Society of New South Wales
Munro May (1961) In Old Aspinall's Day
New South Wales Registry of Births, Deaths and Marriages 
Sands Post Office Directories (1880-1932/33) (POD)
Sydney Morning Herald 9 February 1906
Telephone Directories (TD)

External links
Australian Database of Biographies Entry

1880 births
1953 deaths
Australian general practitioners
People educated at the Presbyterian Ladies' College, Sydney
People educated at Kambala School